Euryhendelimyia schlingeri is a species of flies in the subfamily Eurychoromyiinae.

Distribution
Colombia.

References

Lauxaniidae
Lauxanioidea genera
Diptera of South America